Hünfelden is a municipality in Limburg-Weilburg district in Hesse, Germany. Hünfelden lies on the Hühnerstraße, an historic part of Bundesstraße 417.

Geography

Location 
Hünfelden lies in the Taunus north of Wiesbaden, 9 km southeast of Limburg an der Lahn.

Neighbouring communities 
Hünfelden borders in the north on the town of Limburg and the community of Brechen, in the east on the community of Selters and the town of Bad Camberg (all in Limburg-Weilburg), in the south on the communities of Hünstetten and Aarbergen (both in Rheingau-Taunus-Kreis), and in the west on the Verbandsgemeinden (a kind of collective municipality) of Aar-Einrich and Diez (both in Rhein-Lahn-Kreis in Rhineland-Palatinate).

Constituent communities 
The community consists of seven Ortsteile, each formerly autonomous, listed here with population figures as at 1 January 2008.

Kirberg: 2394
Dauborn: 2764
Mensfelden: 1339
Heringen: 1055
Nauheim: 997
Ohren: 811
Neesbach: 805

History 
The community of Hünfelden came into being within the framework of administrative reform in Hesse on 1 October 1971 through the voluntary merger of the then autonomous communities of Dauborn, Heringen, Kirberg, Mensfelden, Nauheim, Neesbach and Ohren. The name “Hünfelden” was chosen then because of the great number of cromlechs – Hünengräber in German – from Hallstatt times around the centres of Heringen and Ohren. At the time of founding, the community’s population was 6,952.

Among Hünfelden’s constituent communities, Mensfelden can claim the earliest documentary mention, which came in 775. Dauborn, Heringen and the now long-vanished village of Bubenheim, which lay in the area of today’s Kirberg, followed in 790 in the Prüm Abbey’s golden book. Through Hünfelden’s current municipal area ran the Via Publica as well as the Hühnerstraße (roads). In 1355, a castle was built in Kirberg.

In 1235, the Cistercian convent of Gnadenthal was founded, which in 1590 was furnished with a great Abbess’s house. After the Reformation, the site became Nassau stately domain. Since 1969, the Christian community “Jesusbruderschaft” (“Jesus Brotherhood”) has existed there.

Politics

Community council 

The municipal election held on 26 March 2006 yielded the following results:

Culture and sightseeing

Buildings
 Kirberg castle ruins
 Restored timber-frame buildings and former town hall in Kirberg
 Stein’sches Haus in Kirberg
 Former Gnadenthal convent

Museums 
 Heimatmuseum (local lore) in Kirberg.

Economy and infrastructure

Transport 
Hünfelden has developed itself into a popular residential community, as it has at its disposal good transport connections with Wiesbaden and Limburg an der Lahn (Bundesstraße 417) as well as with the Frankfurt Rhein-Main Region over A 3 (Cologne–Frankfurt) through the Limburg-Süd and Bad Camberg interchanges. At the same time, though, it has kept a very quiet and rural character.

Education 
The Freiherr-vom-Stein-Schule is a primary school, Hauptschule and Realschule with a Gymnasium branch.

Public institutions 
 Kindergarten Kirberg
 Kindergarten Dauborn
 Kindergarten Heringen
 Kindergarten Mensfelden
 Kindergarten Nauheim
 Kindergarten Neesbach
 Kindergarten Ohren 
 Kirberg Volunteer Fire Brigade, founded 1905 (includes Youth Fire Brigade)
 Dauborn Volunteer Fire Brigade, founded 1906 (includes Youth Fire Brigade)
 Heringen Volunteer Fire Brigade, founded 1909 (includes Youth Fire Brigade)
 Mensfelden Volunteer Fire Brigade, founded 1935 (includes Youth Fire Brigade)
 Nauheim Volunteer Fire Brigade, founded 1934 (includes Youth Fire Brigade)
 Neesbach Volunteer Fire Brigade, founded 1934 (includes Youth Fire Brigade)
 Ohren Volunteer Fire Brigade, founded 1934 (includes Youth Fire Brigade)

Famous people 
 Wilhelm Bender, Chairman of the board of Fraport AG
 Frank Gerhardt, composer (b. 1967)
 Andreas Felger, painter (b. 1935)
 Hildegard Pfaff, (b. 1952), Hessian politician (SPD)
 Karlheinz Weimar (b. 1950), since 1999 Hessian Finance Minister

References

External links 

 Community’s website

Limburg-Weilburg